Vonhuenia (named after Friedrich von Huene) is an extinct genus of basal archosauriform from the Early Triassic of Russia. Fossils have been found in the Vokhminskaya Formation, along the Vetluga River that are Induan in age, making Vonhuenia one of the earliest archosauriforms.

Classification
The type species V. friedrichi, named in 1992, is based on material that was misassigned to the genus Chasmatosuchus by Ochev (1978). Although originally classified as a proterosuchid, a 2016 cladistic analysis recovered it as a non-eucrocopodan archosauriform of uncertain position.

Paleobiology
Vonhuenia was a small archosauriform that lived alongside amphibians like Tupilakosaurus and Luzocephalus, small reptiles like Phaanthosaurus, and the large-bodied dicynodont Lystrosaurus in the earliest Triassic.

References

Early Triassic reptiles of Europe
Prehistoric reptile genera
Prehistoric archosauriforms